Pablo Herrera may refer to:
Pablo Herrera (politician) (1820–1896), Vice President of Ecuador
Pablo Herrera (beach volleyball) (born 1982), Olympic silver medalist
Pablo Herrera (footballer) (born 1987), Costa Rican footballer
Pablo Herrera (musician), Cuban rap music producer
 Pablo Herrera, a leader of Las Gorras Blancas (1880s−1890s) in the New Mexico Territory